Piloo Sarkari (8 June 1927 – 20 August 2018) was an Indian cyclist. He competed in the team pursuit event at the 1948 Summer Olympics.

References

External links
 

1927 births
2018 deaths
Indian male cyclists
Olympic cyclists of India
Cyclists at the 1948 Summer Olympics
Place of birth missing
Parsi people
Indian emigrants to Canada